Yozgat Province is a province in central Turkey. Its adjacent provinces are Çorum to the northwest, Kırıkkale to the west, Kırşehir to the southwest, Nevşehir to the south, Kayseri to the southeast, Sivas to the east, Tokat to the northeast, and Amasya to the north. The provincial capital is Yozgat.

Districts 

Yozgat province is divided into 14 districts (capital district in bold):
 Akdağmadeni
 Aydıncık
 Boğazlıyan
 Çandır
 Çayıralan
 Çekerek
 Kadışehri
 Saraykent
 Sarıkaya
 Şefaatli
 Sorgun
 Yenifakılı
 Yerköy
 Yozgat

Places of Interest 
 Yozgat Pine Grove National Park
 Yozgat Castle (Historical Behramşah Castle and Tombs)
 Roma Kral Kızı Hamamı
 Yozgat Fatih Tabiat Parkı
 Büyük Camii (Çapanoğlu Mosque)

Churches 
 Fatih Camii, a former church in the city centre
 Yortanlı Sitesi, a former church in the city centre

See also
List of populated places in Yozgat Province

References

External links

  Yozgat official website
  Yozgat governor's official website
  Yozgat municipality's official website
  Yozgat weather forecast information